Lee Ross Hartell (August 23, 1923 – August 27, 1951) was a soldier in the U.S. Army during the Korean War. He posthumously received the Medal of Honor for his actions on August 27, 1951 during the Battle of Bloody Ridge. He joined the Army from Danbury, Connecticut in 1949.

By August 26, 1951, First Lieutenant Hartell was on the ground as a forward observer with B Company, 9th Infantry Regiment at the base of Hill 700 near Kobanson-ni. Hill 700 was attacked and taken by B Company that day. But the Chinese mounted a major counterattack at 04:00. Hartell walked the artillery fire right up the hill on top of the charging enemy. Although wounded, he kept calling in artillery fire onto his hilltop. Finally at 06:30 hours, Hartell was hit in the chest by a bullet and died.

Military service
Lee enlisted in the Connecticut National Guard on June 20, 1940 in the 192nd Field Artillery Battalion.  He transferred to active duty on September 22, 1942 and was wounded in action in the South Pacific on June 19, 1943.  He then transferred to Battery C of the 31st Battalion, 8th Field Artillery training regiment at Fort Sill, Oklahoma and was discharged from active duty on July 1, 1945.  He was discharged from the Connecticut National Guard the following day.  

On August 8, 1946, he rejoined the Connecticut National Guard as a Second Lieutenant and served as an artillery officer with the 963rd Field Artillery battalion.  He was then discharged from the National Guard on January 12, 1948 to enter active duty service.  He was deployed to Korea as part of Battery A, 15th Artillery Battalion of the 2nd Infantry Division.  He was killed in action on August 27, 1951.

Medal of Honor citation
Rank and organization: First Lieutenant, U.S. Army, Battery A, 15th Field Artillery Battalion, 2d Infantry Division

Place and date: Near Kobangsan-ni, Korea, August 27, 1951

Entered service at: Danbury, Conn. Birth: Philadelphia, Pennsylvania 

G.O. No.: 16, February 1, 1952. 

Citation:

1st. Lt. Hartell, a member of Battery A, distinguished himself by conspicuous gallantry and intrepidity at the risk of his life above and beyond the call of duty in action against an armed enemy of the United Nations. During the darkness of early morning, the enemy launched a ruthless attack against friendly positions on a rugged mountainous ridge. 1st Lt. Hartell, attached to Company B, 9th Infantry Regiment, as forward observer, quickly moved his radio to an exposed vantage on the ridge line to adjust defensive fires. Realizing the tactical advantage of illuminating the area of approach, he called for flares and then directed crippling fire into the onrushing assailants. At this juncture a large force of hostile troops swarmed up the slope in banzai charge and came within 10 yards of 1st Lt. Hartell's position. 1st Lt. Hartell sustained a severe hand wound in the ensuing encounter but grasped the microphone with his other hand and maintained his magnificent stand until the front and left flank of the company were protected by a close-in wall of withering fire, causing the fanatical foe to disperse and fall back momentarily. After the numerically superior enemy overran an outpost and was closing on his position, 1st Lt. Hartell, in a final radio call, urged the friendly elements to fire both batteries continuously. Although mortally wounded, 1st Lt. Hartell's intrepid actions contributed significantly to stemming the onslaught and enabled his company to maintain the strategic strongpoint. His consummate valor and unwavering devotion to duty reflect lasting glory on himself and uphold the noble traditions of the military service.

Legacy
One of the main roads at Fort Sill, Oklahoma, was renamed Hartell Boulevard in his honor. 
The Connecticut Army National Guard has named its training installation in Windsor Locks Camp Hartell in his honor. Camp Hartell, at one time the location of the 1st Battalion, 79th Artillery (1960–1971), 7th Infantry Division, Munsan-ni, Korea, was also named in his honor. He had been a resident of Danbury and Lee Hartell Drive in Danbury was posthumously named in his honor. The "Hartell House" is a general officers mess named in his honor which has proudly served the Commanding Generals of United Nations Command, ROK/US Combined Forces Command, United States Forces Korea, and Eighth U.S. Army. He is commemorated by a memorial on the front lawn of the Danbury War Memorial building at the corner of South Street and Memorial Drive. Lee Hartell Chapter 25 of the Disabled American Veterans in Danbury is named for him. He was laid to rest at St. Peter's Cemetery in Danbury.

See also

List of Medal of Honor recipients
List of Korean War Medal of Honor recipients

Notes

References

1923 births
1951 deaths
United States Army Medal of Honor recipients
United States Army officers
American military personnel killed in the Korean War
Korean War recipients of the Medal of Honor
Military personnel from Connecticut
Military personnel from Philadelphia
Connecticut National Guard personnel
United States Army personnel of World War II
United States Army personnel of the Korean War